Jose Iruleguy (born 23 June 1999) is an Uruguayan rugby union player, currently playing for Súper Liga Americana de Rugby side Peñarol. His preferred position is fullback.

Professional career
Iruleguy signed for Súper Liga Americana de Rugby side Peñarol ahead of the 2021 Súper Liga Americana de Rugby season. He has also represented the Uruguay national team.

References

External links
itsrugby.co.uk Profile

1999 births
Living people
Uruguayan rugby union players
Rugby union fullbacks
Peñarol Rugby players
Uruguay international rugby union players
People educated at The British Schools of Montevideo